Checherovsky is a rural locality (a khutor) in Larinskoye Rural Settlement, Alexeyevsky District, Volgograd Oblast, Russia. The population was 181 as of 2010.

Geography 
Checherovsky is located 8 km southeast of Alexeyevskaya (the district's administrative centre) by road. Larinsky is the nearest rural locality.

References 

Rural localities in Alexeyevsky District, Volgograd Oblast